Riaz Sheikh (24 December 1968 – 2 June 2020) was a Pakistani cricketer. He played in 43 first-class and 25 List A matches between 1986 and 2005, and was once considered for selection to the national team. He was believed to have contracted the COVID-19 virus and died in Karachi, but he was buried before this could be confirmed.

References

External links
 

1968 births
2020 deaths
Pakistani cricketers
Karachi cricketers
Defence Housing Authority cricketers
Pakistan National Shipping Corporation cricketers
Cricketers from Karachi
Deaths from the COVID-19 pandemic in Sindh